Steenburg Lake is a lake in the Trent River and Lake Ontario drainage basins in the township of Limerick, Hastings County, Ontario, Canada, about  west of Ontario Highway 62 and  south of the town of Bancroft.

Hydrology
It has six named islands: Crab Island, Dewey's Island, Picket Island, Bateman's Island, Uncle Bob's Island and Powers Island; and two named bays: Adam's Bay and Austin's Bay. Sunset Point from the east and The Headland from the west jut into the middle of the lake.

There are six inflows. Mud Creek from Paddy's Lake at the southwest is the only named one. The other five unnamed creek inflows are: two at the northwest, one at the north, one at the northeast and one at the east. The primary outflow is Bass Creek to Limerick Lake, which flows via Beaver Creek, the Crowe River and the Trent River to the Bay of Quinte on Lake Ontario at Trenton.

Settlements
Steenburg Lake is on the northwest bay.

See also
List of lakes in Ontario

References

Lakes of Hastings County